Gemenc is a unique forest that is found between Szekszárd and Baja, in Hungary. This is the only remaining tidal area of the Danube in Hungary. The wood's fauna include stags, boars, storks, grey herons, gyrfalcons, white-tailed eagles, and kites. Various amphibians and reptiles can also be found. The stag population has worldwide fame, since its genetic stock is outstanding, and the stags' antlers are impressive. Due to the various watery habitats, many fish species are present.

Close to the waters, willow and poplar forests are typical. It is the habitat of the curiosity Freyer's purple emperor. Furthermore, Gemenc is home to 13 other sheltered butterfly species.

Farther from the rivers, large oak-ash-elm forests spread. These are the homes of the stag beetles, great pricorn beetles, as well as of a kind of spider which only lives in Gemenc.

Gemenc is a nature reserve that is part of the Danube-Drava National Park.

Vignettes of specific species of the fauna of the sanctuary make up the film Gyöngyvirágtól lombhullásig [From Blossom Time to Autumn Frost] (1953) by nature documentary film-maker István Homoki Nagy.

References

External links
 Gemenc Forest and Game Co. Ltd. - forest management
Gemenc Co. Ltd. in English
 Gemenc Forest School - English site Dead Link
 danubemap.eu 
 "I Like Gemenc" a video showing a day of the narrow gauge, logging railroad

Geography of Hungary
Bačka
Protected areas established in 1977
Ramsar sites in Hungary
Forests of Hungary
Geography of Tolna County
Geography of Bács-Kiskun County
Tourist attractions in Tolna County
Tourist attractions in Bács-Kiskun County